Surabaya is the capital of East Java province and second largest city in Indonesia. It is also one of the oldest cities in Southeast Asia and was the largest city in Dutch East Indies. The city is home to numerous high rise buildings. The city is currently going through the stage of transforming its skylines in the process of development of high rise skyscrapers, which include commercial, shopping malls, apartments, condominiums, and hotels. At present there are more than twenty completed 150m+ skyscrapers and another ten are under construction.

Tallest buildings
List of the tallest buildings in Surabaya with minimum height of 100 meters and above, which are completed or topped out. An equal sign (=) following a rank indicates the same height between two or more buildings. The "Year" column indicates the year in which a building was completed.

List of tallest buildings under construction and proposed

Under construction
List of the highrise buildings in Surabaya, which are under construction and have at least 30 floors.

See also

List of cities with the most skyscrapers
 List of tallest buildings in Indonesia
 List of tallest buildings in Jakarta
 List of tallest buildings in Batam
List of tallest buildings in Medan

References

Buildings and structures in Surabaya
Tallest, Surabaya
Surabaya